John Vasil Krutilla (February 13, 1922 – June 27, 2003) was an American environmental economist, known for inventing the concept of existence value, the idea that undisturbed wilderness has economic value. According to Kenneth Arrow,

Krutilla was born in Tacoma, Washington; his parents were farmers who had immigrated there from Slovakia. After serving in the U.S. Coast Guard during World War II, he earned a bachelor's degree in economics from Reed College in 1949, a master's degree from Harvard University in 1951, and a Ph.D. from Harvard in 1952.
He worked from 1952 to 1955 at the Tennessee Valley Authority, before going to Resources for the Future where he worked until his retirement in 1988.

Krutilla is perhaps most famous for his essay, "Conservation Reconsidered," in which he coined the idea of Existence value.

With Allen V. Kneese, he was the inaugural winner of the Volvo Environment Prize in 1990.

References

Harvard University alumni
Reed College alumni
1922 births
2003 deaths
American people of Slovak descent
20th-century American economists
Environmental economists
Resources for the Future
United States Coast Guard personnel of World War II